Marian Cristian Botezatu (born 26 December 2000) is a Romanian international footballer who plays for Foresta Suceava, on loan from FCSB II, as a defender.

Career
A product of the FCSB youth academy, Botezatu made his first team debut for the club on 27 September 2018 against Unirea Alba Iulia in the Cupa României. On 11 August 2019, Botezatu made his Liga I debut for FCSB, scoring an own goal in 3–1 loss against Voluntari.

Career statistics

Club
Statistics accurate as of match played 11 August 2019.

References

2000 births
Living people
Sportspeople from Piatra Neamț
Romanian footballers
Association football defenders
FC Steaua București players
Liga I players
Liga III players
ACS Foresta Suceava players